Abbey FM was a local radio station for Barrow-in-Furness and the Furness Peninsula. The station ceased transmission at 3pm on 30 January 2009 and was placed into administration with the loss of seven jobs. This followed one of the station's main backers, The Local Radio Company, withdrawing their support three weeks earlier. The Station Manager at the time Amanda Bell told the North West Evening Mail that this "forced the hand of the other shareholders" and that she was only informed of their decision on the day of the closure at 12.30pm.

Abbey FM was owned by The Radio Business Ltd (35%), CN Group Ltd (30%) and The Local Radio Company Ltd (35%). The licence was for a locally focused, full-service, music and information lifestyle station for 25- to 64-year-olds service to serve the town of Barrow-in-Furness and the immediately surrounding area, which has an adult population (aged 15+) of around 65,000.

The licence was issued for a twelve-year period.

As of 3pm on Friday 30 January 2009 Abbey FM stopped broadcasting, shortly after the announcement that the station had been placed into administration by its joint owners CN Group, TLRC and The Radio Business.

References

External links

The Local Radio Company
Defunct radio stations in the United Kingdom
Barrow-in-Furness
Mass media in Cumbria
Radio stations established in 2006
Radio stations disestablished in 2009